Live 1967 is a live album by the Monkees, compiled from show dates in Seattle, Portland and Spokane on their 1967 United States tour. The songs mostly feature the Monkees themselves singing and playing, although the "solo spots" for each member feature music by opening act The Sundowners.

In 2001, Rhino Handmade Records released all recordings from the Mobile, Spokane, Portland and Seattle shows on a limited edition Monkees CD release, Summer 1967: The Complete U.S. Concert Recordings.

During these dates, Davy Jones and Kim Capli of the Sundowners went by themselves to a local recording studio, making "Hard to Believe", which was included on Pisces, Aquarius, Capricorn, & Jones, Ltd..

Track listing

Disc 1

 Tracks 10, 11, 12 and 13 are bonus tracks, available only on the 1988 Rhino CD and 2016 Friday Music LP.

References

The Monkees live albums
The Monkees compilation albums
1987 live albums
Rhino Handmade live albums
Rhino Handmade compilation albums